Alexandrovka is a rural locality (a selo) in Yumaguzinsky Selsoviet, Kugarchinsky District, Bashkortostan, Russia. The population was 367 as of 2010. There are 2 streets.

Geography 
Alexandrovka is located 37 km northwest of Mrakovo (the district's administrative centre) by road. Yumaguzino is the nearest rural locality.

References 

Rural localities in Kugarchinsky District